Van Calster is a surname. Notable people with the surname include:

Geert Van Calster (born 1970), Belgian lawyer and legal scholar
Guido Van Calster (born 1956), Belgian cyclist

See also
Van Colster baronets

Surnames of Dutch origin